Crown may refer to the following communities in West Virginia:
Crown, Logan County, West Virginia
Crown, Monongalia County, West Virginia